Patrick Matt (born 4 April 1969) is a retired male track cyclist from Liechtenstein, who competed for his native country in two events at the 1988 Summer Olympics in Seoul, South Korea. His best result at the games was finishing in 18th place in the Men's Individual Pursuit (4,000 metres). Matt also competed at the 1992 Summer Olympics in Barcelona, Spain.

References

1969 births
Living people
Liechtenstein male cyclists
Liechtenstein track cyclists
Cyclists at the 1988 Summer Olympics
Cyclists at the 1992 Summer Olympics
Olympic cyclists of Liechtenstein